Exometoeca is a genus of skipper butterflies in the family Hesperiidae. It is monotypic, with the only species being Exometoeca nycteris.

References

Hesperiidae
Monotypic butterfly genera
Taxa named by Edward Meyrick
Hesperiidae genera